Spilamberto is a comune (municipality) in the Province of Modena in the Italian region Emilia-Romagna, located about  west of Bologna and about  southeast of Modena.

Famous in June is the Fiera di San Giovanni, attracting a lot of people in the town. Spilamberto is a renowned center of production of balsamic vinegar and other typical products of the region.
Also famous for Giovanni Cavani luthier whose musical instruments are famous all over the world.

Religious buildings
Among the churches within the town limits are:
Chiesa della Beata Vergine
Chiesa delle Monache Cappuccine Scalze
San Giovanni Battista
Sant'Adriano III Papa
Santa Maria degli Angioli
San Vito Martire
Oratorio della Santissima Annunziata di Collecchio
Oratorio di S. Liberata

References

External links
 Official website
Amici della Musica Spilamberto (Concerts and Music School)

Cities and towns in Emilia-Romagna